Józef Świeżyński (19 April 1868 – 12 February 1948) was the prime minister of the Kingdom of Poland for a short time — from 23 October 1918 to 4 November 1918.

Citations 

1868 births
1948 deaths
People from Opatów County
People from Radom Governorate
National League (Poland) members
National-Democratic Party (Poland) politicians
Prime Ministers of Poland
Members of the 1st State Duma of the Russian Empire
Members of the 3rd State Duma of the Russian Empire
Members of the 4th State Duma of the Russian Empire
People of the Kingdom of Poland (1917–1918)
Association of the Polish Youth "Zet" members
Commanders with Star of the Order of Polonia Restituta